Rock 'n' Roll is the second album of the skacore band Potshot. The album was released in the United States by Asian Man Records in 1999.

Tracks
 Sing Along With Potshot    :41 
 Freedom    1:41 
 Feel   2:05 
 Believe Ourselves    2:18 
 Trashy Talk    1:53 
 Go & See My Sweet Pie    2:18 
 I Can    2:19 
 Pure & Tender    1:42 
 Being With Me    1:35 
 Those Days    1:39 
 Beyond the Truth    1:09 
 Kiss the Fact    1:58 
 Bonus Track   1:19

1999 albums
Potshot (band) albums
Asian Man Records albums